The Saudi Pro League (SPL for short) (Dawriyy al-Muḥtarifayni as-Suʿūdī), known as the Roshn Saudi League (RSL for short) (Dawriyy Roshan as-Suʿūdī) for sponsorship reasons, is the top division of association football in the Saudi Arabian league system. It has been operating as a round-robin tournament from it inaugural season until the 1989–90 season, after that the Saudi Federation decided to merge the football League with the King's Cup in one tournament and the addition of the Golden Box. The Golden Box would be an end of season knockout competition played between the top four teams of the regular league season. These teams would play at a semi-final stage to crown the champions of Saudi Arabia. The league reverted to a round-robin system in the 2007–08 season.

The association is also regularly ranked with the highest coefficient in Asia due to having successful and consistent performances in the AFC Champions League by its clubs. 

The first season of competition was the 1976–77 season. Al Hilal is the most successful team, holding 18 titles in its history and most recently winning the title in 2021–22.

History
Up until the late 1950s, football in Saudi Arabia was organized on a regional basis, with the only nationwide tournament being the King's Cup. In 1957, the first qualification process consolidated the regional tournaments of the Central, West, East and North regions. Clubs competed in their regional leagues to qualify for the King's Cup, which was the final stage of the competition. The winner of the King's Cup was not the league winner.

1976 saw the start of the first ever professional football league in the Kingdom of Saudi Arabia with eight teams, the following season the number of clubs increased to ten. The 1981–82 season saw the merger of both the Saudi Premier League and the Saudi First Division for that season exclusively to the concern of the 1982 FIFA World Cup qualification process. Twenty teams were divided into two groups, A and B. The top two in each group would enter a semi-final stage to determine the overall champions. In the following season which reverted back to regular round robin competition, the number of first-division clubs was later increased to 12 in the 1984–85 season.

In December 1990, the Saudi federation decided to merge the league with the king cup in one tournament, it was decided to revamp local competitions and to introduce professional football. A new league championship was formed called "The Custodian of The Two Holy Mosques League Cup", which was a two-stage championship. The first stage was a regular double round-robin league competition with the top 4 qualifying to the final knockout stage, called the golden box. Clubs were allowed to sign players on a professional basis making the league semi professional. This system lasted for seventeen seasons before reverting to a regular round robin competition. The league became fully professional in 2007.

As of 2008, depending on the nation's coefficient, four teams from Saudi Arabia qualify for the AFC Champions League annually. This includes the top three positions of the league, together with the winner of the King Cup. If the winner of the King Cup is also among the top three teams then the fourth-best team qualifies to the play-offs, and if the winner of the King Cup is not in the top three league positions in the league, the top two will qualify directly to the group stages while the third team will qualify for the AFC Champions League play-offs.

Competition format

Competition
There are 16 clubs in the Saudi Professional League. During the course of a season (usually from August to May) each club plays the other clubs twice (a double round-robin system), once at their home stadium and once at that of their opponents, for 30 games. Teams receive three points for a win and one point for a draw. No points are awarded for a loss. Teams are ranked by position on the league table depending on points, then the head-to-head record between the tied teams is taken into consideration, and then goal difference.

Promotion and relegation
A system of promotion and relegation exists between the Saudi Professional League and the Saudi First Division League. The three lowest placed teams in the Saudi Professional League are relegated to the First Division, and the top three teams from the First Division are promoted to the Saudi Professional League.

List of teams (2021–22 season)
For details on the 2021–22 Saudi Professional League season, see here.

 Note: Table lists in alphabetical order.

1:  Al-Faisaly play their home games in Al Majma'ah. 

2:  Al-Hilal also use Prince Faisal bin Fahd Stadium (22,500 seats) as a home stadium.

3:  Al-Shabab FC also use Prince Faisal bin Fahd Stadium (22,500 seats) as a home stadium.

List of champions

Champions

Performance by club

Total titles won by city

Title-winning managers

Top scorers

All-time top scorers

Boldface indicates a player still active in the Pro League.

Top scorers by season

Broadcasters

See also

Saudi Arabian Football Federation
King Cup
Saudi Super Cup
Saudi Crown Prince Cup
King Abdulaziz
Prince Faisal bin Fahd League U-21

References

External links
MBS League SAFF
Saudi Pro League Statistics
Saudi Professional League Commission 
Abdul Latif Jameel League 
Saudi Arabia Football Federation at FIFA.com
Saudi Arabia – List of Champions at RSSSF.com
Saudi Pro League summary(SOCCERWAY)

Saudi Professional League
Football leagues in Saudi Arabia
Top level football leagues in Asia
1976 establishments in Saudi Arabia
Sports leagues established in 1976